
Gmina Banie is a rural gmina (administrative district) in Gryfino County, West Pomeranian Voivodeship, in north-western Poland.

Villages
Gmina Banie contains the villages and settlements of Babinek, Banie, Baniewice, Dłusko Gryfińskie, Dłużyna, Górnowo, Górny Młyn, Kunowo, Lubanowo, Otoki, Parnica, Piaseczno, Piaskowo, Rożnowo, Skotniki, Sosnowo, Swobnica, Trzaski and Tywica.

Neighbouring gminas
Gmina Banie is bordered by the gminas of Bielice, Chojna, Gryfino, Kozielice, Myślibórz, Pyrzyce, Trzcińsko-Zdrój and Widuchowa.

References
Polish official population figures 2006

Banie
Gryfino County